"Against Androtion" was a speech composed by Demosthenes in which he accused Androtion of making an illegal proposal. This was the first surviving speech of Demosthenes composed on public charges (γραφαί).

The case was brought in 355/4 by Diodoros and Euktemon, and concerned Androtion's proposal that the council of that year be awarded a crown for their services.  This was a customary award for the outgoing council every year, but the crown was only to be awarded to a council that had built a certain number of triremes that year.  Despite the council of 355/4 BC having built no triremes, Androtion proposed that the crown should be awarded.  After Androtion's proposal was passed, Euktemon and Diodorus brought a prosecution against Androtion claiming that the proposal had been illegal.

Androtion was acquitted, and continued to be active in Athenian politics at least until 347/6.

See also
 Graphe paranomon

Citations

External links
Text of the speech at the Perseus Digital Library

Works by Demosthenes
Ancient Greek orations